Sabula is an unincorporated community in southwest Iron County, in the U.S. state of Missouri. The community is on the east floodplain of Big Creek along Missouri Route 49 between Annapolis three miles to the south and Glover about 5.5 miles to the north.

History
Sabula was originally called Reynolds, and under the latter name was platted in 1873 when the railroad was extended to that point. A post office called Sabula was established in 1884, and remained in operation until 1953.

References

Unincorporated communities in Iron County, Missouri
Unincorporated communities in Missouri